Narine is both a feminine given name of Armenian origin, and a surname perhaps of Indian origin. People with that name include:

Given name
 Narine Aleqsanyan (born 1967), Armenian actress and presenter
 Narine Dovlatyan (born 1991), Armenian jazz singer and actress
 Narine Karakashian (born 1971), Armenian chess player
 Narine Misak Balayan (born 1940), see Ministers of Social Protection of the Second Republic of Armenia#Narine Misak Balayan
 Nariné Simonian (born 1965), Armenian-French classical organist

Surname
 David Narine (born 1949), Guyanese former cricket umpire
 Sunil Narine (born 1988), Trinidadian cricketer

See also
 Nareen Shammo (born 1986), Yazidi investigative journalist and minority rights activist
 Narin (disambiguation)
 

Armenian feminine given names
Given names derived from plants or flowers